Dillon County Airport  is a county-owned public-use airport located three nautical miles (6 km) north of the central business district of Dillon, a city in Dillon County, South Carolina, United States.

Although most U.S. airports use the same three-letter location identifier for the FAA and IATA, this airport is assigned DLC by the FAA and DLL by the IATA (which assigned DLC to Dalian Zhoushuizi International Airport in Dalian, Liaoning, People's Republic of China).

Facilities and aircraft 
It has one asphalt paved runway designated 7/25 which measures 3,000 by 60 feet (914 x 18 m). For the 12-month period ending April 5, 2007, the airport had 2,100 aircraft operations, an average of 175 per month: 95% general aviation and 5% military.

References

External links 
 FAA Promotional Film for Dillon County Airport 1964 https://www.youtube.com/watch?v=sKd8TQ0z7YA
 
 

Airports in South Carolina
Buildings and structures in Dillon County, South Carolina
Transportation in Dillon County, South Carolina